The Flos Duellatorum is the name given to one of the manuscript versions of Fiore dei Liberi's illuminated manuscript fight book, written in 1410 (dated to 1409 in the old reckoning). There are five other surviving recensions, under the title Fior di Battaglia. Both Flos Duellatorum and Fior di Battaglia translate into English roughly as "The Flower of Battle," from Latin and Italian respectively.

Manuscripts
The manuscript dated to 1409 was considered lost, and is now known to be  kept in a private collection. It is referred to as the Pisani-Dossi manuscript for the last collection it was a part of before its disappearance. The information contained within survives in the form of a 1902 facsimile by the Italian historian Francesco Novati. Because of this, the Flos Duellatorum is also known as the Novati Manuscript, or the Novati Edition.

The other two surviving manuscripts are the Getty-Ludwig ("Getty's copy", Los Angeles, MS Ludwig XV13) and the Pierpont Morgan Library ("Morgan's copy", New York, MS M 0.0383) copies.  Both of these bear the title Fior di Battaglia, and both are undated.

The Morgan copy unlike the other two versions does not contain a dedication to Nicolò III d'Este, in whose service Fiore composed his treatise.  Its prologue is similar to the Getty version.

The Getty-Ludwig version is the most informative, being distinguished by several categorizations added by its copyist and, according to Robert Charron, an expert on the manuscript, by the degree of comprehension of the master's teaching displayed.

Inventories of the Estense library in Ferrara indicate that there were at least five copies of Fiore's work. By 1508, the manuscripts cease to be mentioned in the inventories. Two versions of Fiore's manuscript re-surfaced in private collections in Venice. The Morgan and Getty versions both were kept in England during the 19th century, before being moved to their present locations in America in the 20th century.

Contents
The Novati consists of illustrated pictures of the plays accompanied by short, rhyming verses in Italian to describe them.

The Pisani-Dossi version contains major sections on:
Wrestling
Dagger play (including defenses against a dagger when armed with a dagger and without one)
Sword in one hand
Spear and staff (The weapons are treated identically in Fiore's system)
Sword in two hands
Sword in armour (Chiefly halfswording techniques)
Poleaxe
Mounted combat (including wrestling, swordplay, and the lance from horseback)
Sword vs. Dagger

Fiore also mentions the use of:
Bastoncello (The baton)
Staff and dagger
Pairs of clubs or cudgels
The use of the chiavarina (spear) against a man on horseback

Sette spade
The best known image from the Flos Duellatorum is the sette spade (seven swords) diagram at the beginning of the longsword section (fol. 17A), reminiscent of the first image of the Codex Wallerstein. It is a figure of a man, divided by seven swords centered on the body, representing the poste or guard positions. This is surrounded by four animals, representing the main virtues of a fencer:
on top, the lynx, holding a compass represents prudentia:

"No other creature is able to look so clearly as me, the lynx / and by this I ever I ever reckon by compass and measure"
to the left, the tiger holding an arrow represents celeritas

"I am the tiger, I am very quick to run and turn / That the arrow in the sky cannot approach me."
to the right, the lion holding a heart represents audatia

"None bears a more ardent heart than me, a lion / And I challenge anyone to battle."
on the bottom, the elephant, carrying a tower, represents fortitudo:

"I am the elephant and I have a castle for a burden / And never do I kneel down nor do I lose my true place."

See also
Italian school of swordsmanship

External links
 Novati facsimile of the Pisani-Dossi MS (PDF file, 42M)
" The Flower of Battle" (Getty's copy)
 Fior Di Battaglia Translation and Interpretation Project (text and translation)
 AEMMA Flos Duellatorum material
 Sala d'Arme Achille Marozzo (Italian Ancient Fencing Art Institute) transcriptions (Getty, Morgan and Pisani-Dossi) 
Fiore Dei Liberi: 14th century Master of Defence by John Clements (ARMA)
 http://www.getty.edu/art/collection/objects/1443/unknown-fiore-furlan-dei-liberi-da-premariacco-il-fior-di-battaglia-italian-about-1410/ - Versione digitale del manoscritto al P. Getty Museum

Further reading
 Flos Duellatorum -  Manuale di Arte del Combattimento del XV secolo di Fiore dei Liberi, Italian Publication by Marco Rubboli and Luca Cesari, Il Cerchio - Gli Archi, 

Historical European martial arts
15th-century illuminated manuscripts